2011 MLS Draft may refer to:
2011 MLS SuperDraft
2011 MLS Supplemental Draft